Elisa Ramírez (born 1943) is a Spanish film and television actress.

Selected filmography
 Another's Wife (1967)
 The Wanton of Spain (1969)
 The Troublemaker (1969)
 The Man Who Wanted to Kill Himself (1970)
 Man with the Golden Winchester (1973)

References

Bibliography
 Goble, Alan. The Complete Index to Literary Sources in Film. Walter de Gruyter, 1999.

External links

People from Valencia
1943 births
Living people
Spanish film actresses
Spanish television actresses